The following is a timeline of the history of the city of Cairo, Egypt.

Prior to 19th century

 1st C. BCE – Babylon Fortress built (approximate date).
 33 CE – Origins of the Coptic Orthodox Church.
 4th–5th C. CE – Saints Sergius and Bacchus Church (Abu Serga) built.
 6th C. – Church of Saint Menas established.
 642 – Mosque of Amr ibn al-As built.
 873 – Ahmad ibn Tulun founds El-Katai.
 879 
 Mosque of Ibn Tulun built.
 Church of St. George built (approximate date).
 Church of the Virgin Mary (Haret Zuweila) built (approximate date).
 970
 Misr al-Qahira settlement founded by Fatimid Al-Mu'izz li-Din Allah.
 Al-Azhar University established.
 972 – Al-Azhar Mosque established.
 978 –The Hanging Church rebuilt (approximate date).
 979 – Saint Mercurius Church in Coptic Cairo rebuilt (approximate date).
 992 – Al-Hakim Mosque built.
 11th C. – Church of the Holy Virgin (Babylon El-Darag) built.
 1016 – Lulua Mosque built.
 1073 – Saint Barbara Church in Coptic Cairo restored.
 1085 – Juyushi Mosque built.
 1092 – City wall and Gates of Cairo built (including Bab Zuweila and Bab al-Nasr).
 1125 – Aqmar Mosque built.
 1154 – Al-Hussein Mosque built.
 1160 – Al-Salih Tala'i Mosque built.
 1168 – Egypt's capital moved from Fustat to Cairo.
 1176 – Cairo was unsuccessfully attacked in the Crusades.
 1183 – Saladin Citadel built.
 ca.1205 – Bab Moshé (Ibn Maimoun) Synagogue established
 1250 – City becomes capital of Mamluk Sultanate.
 1280 – Qalawun complex built (approximate date).
 1318 – Al-Nasir Muhammad Mosque built.
 1340 – Mosque of Amir al-Maridani established.
 1347 – Aqsunqur Mosque built.
 1349 – Mosque of Shaykhu built.
 1352 – Amir Taz Palace built.
 1355 – Khanqah of Shaykhu built.
 1359 – Mosque-Madrassa of Sultan Hassan built.

 1421 – Mosque of Sultan al-Muayyad built.
 1517
 January: Battle of Ridaniya occurs near Cairo.
 Capture of Cairo by Ottoman forces.
 City becomes provincial capital during Selim I's rule of Ottoman Empire.
 1774 – Mosque of Abu Dahab built.
 1788 – Al Musafir Khana Palace built.
 1798 – Napoleon arrives.
 1800 – Population: 200,000 (approximate figure).

19th century

 1801 – June: Siege of Cairo – French surrender to British and Ottoman forces.
 1811 – March: Massacre of the Citadel.
 1822 – Arabic printing press in operation.
 1827 – Kasr Al-Ainy Medical School established.
 1828
 Government al-Waqa'i' al-Masriyya newspaper begins publication.
 Dar al-Mahfuzat (government archive) established.
 1848 – Mosque of Muhammad Ali built.
 1854 – Khorenian School begins.
 1856 – Railway station built.
 1863 – Museum of Egyptian antiquities founded at Bulak.
 1860 – Shepheard's Hotel in operation.
 1869 – Khedivial Opera House opens.
 1870 – Egyptian National Library and Archives established.
 1871– 24 December: Premiere of Verdi's Aida.
 1874 – Abdeen Palace built.
 1875 – Al-Ahram newspaper begins publication.
 1877 – Traffic in slaves ceased.
 1879 – Collège de la Sainte Famille founded
 1880 – Comité de Conservation des Monuments de l'Art Arabe established.
 1882
 British occupation.
 Khedivial Sporting Club founded.
 Population: 347,838.
 1888 – Collège des Frères (Bab al-Louq) opens.
 1892 – Ben Ezra Synagogue built.
 1893 – Le Progrès Egyptien newspaper begins publication.
 1897
 El Khalig canal filled in.
 Population: 570,062. 
 1899
 Sha'ar Hashamayim Synagogue built
 Al-Ahram newspaper headquartered in Cairo.
 1900 – Ets Hayim Synagogue (Hanan Synagogue) established

20th century

1900s–1940s

 1902 – Museum of Egyptian antiquities moved again.
 1905 – Chaar Hachamaim Synagogue established
 1906 – Pathé cinema built.
 1907
 Al Ahly Sporting Club formed.
 Population: 654,476. 
 1908
 Cairo University and Café Riche opened.
  and American College for Girls founded.
 1910
 Coptic Museum built.
 Heliopolis Palace Hotel opened.
 Heliopolis Sporting Club founded.
 1905 – Shimon Bar Yochai Synagogue established
 1911
 Zamalek Sporting Club formed.
 Baron Empain Palace built.
 1912
 Boulak Bridge and Al-Rifa'i Mosque built.
 1915
 Arev and Housaper newspapers begin publication.
 1919
 Uprising against British occupation.
 American University in Cairo established.
 1921 – Cairo Conference held.
 1922
 Tutankhamun's tomb discovered.
 1924 
19 November: British governor-general Stack of Anglo-Egyptian Sudan assassinated.
 "Cairo Edition" of Quran Published
 1925 – Pahad Itzhak (Kreim) Synagogue established
 1929 – Manial Palace built.
 1932
 Society Of The Muslim Brothers headquartered in Cairo.
 Moussa Dar'i Synagogue established
 1933 – Qasr al-Nil Bridge built.
 1934 – St. George's College, Cairo established.
 1934 – Meir'enaim (Biton) Synagogue established
 1937
 Yacoubian Building constructed.
 Lycée La Liberté Héliopolis opens
 1938 – Publication of The Egyptian Gazette moves from Alexandria to Cairo.
 1940 – Metro Cinema opens.
 1942 – Abdeen Palace Incident.
 1944 – Cairo Forces Parliament meeting.
 The Arab Women's Congress of 1944 is hosted by the Egyptian Feminist Union in Cairo and the Pan-Arabian Arab Feminist Union is founded. 
 1945
 Arab League headquartered in Cairo.
 Ashkènazim Synagogue restored
 1946 – Ali Baba Cinema opens.
 1947 – Population: 2,090,654.
 1948
 Tchahagir newspaper begins publication.
 Rivoli Cinema opens.
 1949 – 12 February: Muslim leader Hassan al-Banna assassinated.

1950s–1990s
 1950 – Ain Shams University founded.
 1952
 Cairo Fire.
 The Mogamma built.
 Ismailia Square renamed Tahrir Square.
 Egyptian Revolution of 1952
 Al Akhbar starts publication.
 1954 – Al Gomhuria newspaper begins publication.
 1956
 Cairo International Stadium opens.
 City master plan created.
 1959
 Cairo Conservatoire opens.
 Academy of Arts (Egypt) and Cairo Symphony Orchestra founded.
 Arab Petroleum Congress meets in Cairo.
 1961 – Cairo Tower built.
 1963 – Cairo International Airport opens.
 1964 – January: 1964 Arab League summit (Cairo) held.
 1965 – Population: 3.3 million.
 1966 – Cairo Opera Ballet Company founded.
 1967 – Bab Moshé (Ibn Maimoun) Synagogue restored.
 1968 – Saint Mark's Coptic Orthodox Cathedral built.
 1969 – Cairo International Book Fair founded.
 1970
 January: Israeli forces conduct aerial attacks near Cairo.
 September: 1970 Arab League summit held.
 Greater Cairo Master Plan created.
 1972 – January: Student demonstration.
 1974 – Population: 5,715,000.
 1975
 January: Economic demonstration.
 Unknown Soldier Memorial (Egypt) inaugurated.
 1976
 1976 Arab League summit (Cairo).
 Cairo International Film Festival begins.
 British International School in Cairo established.
 Manor House School, Cairo opens.
 1977 – January: Economic demonstration.
 1978 – New Cairo British International School formed.
 1979
Egypt Today magazine begins publication.
 Faisal Islamic Bank of Egypt established.
 Sister city relationships established with Frankfurt and Stuttgart, Germany.
 1981
 6 October: Assassination of Anwar Sadat.
 Sadat Academy for Management Sciences opens.
 1982
 Saint Fatima School begins.
 Sister city relationship established with New York City, United States.
 1984
 Master Plan for Greater Cairo approved.
 Arab Democratic Nasserist Party founded.
 1985
 Child Museum opens.
 Sister city relationship established with Paris, France.
 1986 – February: 1986 Egyptian conscripts riot occurs.
 1987 – Cairo Metro Line 1 begins operating.
 1988
 Cairo Opera House opens.
 Sister city relationship established with Istanbul, Turkey.
 1989
 al-Hirafiyeen neighborhood built.
 Sister city relationship established with Ottawa, Ontario, Canada.
 1990
 The American International School in Egypt opens.
 Sister city relationship established with Beijing, China and Tokyo, Japan.
 1991 – Al-Ahram Weekly begins publication.
 1992
 Earthquake.
 Population: 6,800,000 (estimate).
 1993
 Asyut–Cairo highway constructed.
 Sister city relationship established with Barcelona, Spain.
 1995 – Dreamland development begins near city.
 1996
6th October Bridge built.
 Cairo Metro Line 2 (Shoubra AlKheiman- AlMounieb) opened.
 1997
 Aldiwan Arabic Language Center opens.
 Sister city relationship established with Xi'an, China and Seoul, South Korea.
 1998 – Sister city relationships established with Houston, United States and Minsk, Belarus.

21st century

2000s
 2001
 Misr American College established.
 Cairo 52 arrested.
 2003 – El Sawy culturewheel built.
 2004
 Al-masry Al-youm newspaper begins publication.
 Canadian International College established.
 Abdul Azim Wazir becomes governor of Cairo (approximate date).
 2005
 April 2005 Cairo terrorist attacks
 British University in Egypt established.
 Al-Azhar Park built.
 El Fagr newspaper begins publication.
 2006
 City government website online (approximate date).
 Al-Resalah television begins broadcasting.
 2007
City hosts 11th Pan Arab Games.
57357 Hospital established.
 2008 – Youm 7 newspaper starts publication.
 2009
 2009 Khan el-Khalili bombing
 Cairo Jazz Festival begins.

2010s
 2010 – Population: 7,248,671.
 2011
 25 January: Uprising against Mubarak regime begins.
 April: Abdel Qawi Khalifa becomes governor of Cairo.
 2012
Cairo Metro Line 3 (Imbaba / Mohandiseen – Cairo Int'l Airport) opened.
Pope Shenouda III, head of Egyptian Coptic church, died.
Protests against state president Mohamed Morsi.
 2013
Anti-Morsi protests.
 February: The first Iranian president, Ahmadinejad, to visit Egypt since 1979.
 April: Violence against Coptic after funeral.
 3 July: 2013 Egyptian coup d'état.
 8 July: "Egyptian soldiers fire on Morsi supporters protesting outside a military facility in Cairo, killing over 50."
 14 August: "More than 600 people, mostly Morsi supporters, are killed when police clear two pro-Morsi sit-ins in Cairo."
 Air pollution in greater Cairo reaches annual mean of 76 PM2.5 and 179 PM10, much higher than recommended.
 2017 – Population: 9,539,673 (urban agglomeration).

2020s
 2021 – 2021 Cairo clothing factory fire

See also
 
 History of Egypt
 
 List of cities by population density
 Timelines of other cities in Egypt: Alexandria, Port Said

References

This article incorporates information from the Arabic Wikipedia.

Bibliography

Published in 18th–19th century

Published in 20th century

Published in 21st century

External links

  (Bibliography of open access  articles)
 
  (Images, etc.)
  (Images, etc.)
  (Images, etc.)
  (Bibliography)
  (Bibliography)
  (Bibliography)
 

Cairo
 
Egypt articles needing attention
Cairo-related lists
Years in Egypt
cairo
Cairo